Imran Manack (born 23 December 1991) is a South African cricketer. He made his first-class debut for Easterns in the 2012–13 CSA Provincial Three-Day Competition on 31 January 2013. He made his List A debut for Easterns in the 2013–14 CSA Provincial One-Day Competition on 13 October 2013.

In September 2018, he was named in Easterns' squad for the 2018 Africa T20 Cup. He was the leading wicket-taker for Easterns in the 2018–19 CSA Provincial One-Day Challenge, with 22 dismissals in nine matches. In September 2019, he was named in Easterns' squad for the 2019–20 CSA Provincial T20 Cup. In April 2021, he was named in Boland's squad, ahead of the 2021–22 cricket season in South Africa.

References

External links
 

1991 births
Living people
South African cricketers
Easterns cricketers
Tshwane Spartans cricketers
Cricketers from Johannesburg